Manel may refer to:

People
 Manel (born 1971), Spanish football player
 Manel (born 1972), Spanish football player
 Manel (born 1973), Spanish football player
 Manel Abeysekera, Sri Lankan diplomat
 Manel Bosch (born 1967), Spanish basketball player
 Manel Cruz, member of Ornatos Violeta
 Manel Esclusa (born 1952), Catalan photographer
 Manel Esteller (born 1968), Spanish geneticist
 Manel Expósito (born 1981), Spanish football player
 Manel Fontdevila
 Manel Guillen (born 1967), Spanish businessman, lawyer and activist investor
 Manel Kape (born 1993), Angolian mixed martial artist
 Manel Kouki (born 1988), Tunisian handball player
 Manel Loureiro, Spanish author
 Manel Martínez (born 1992), Spanish football player
 Manel Muñoz, Spanish cyborg artist
 Manel Navarro (born 1996), Spanish singer and songwriter
 Manel Pelegrina Lopez (born 1968), Andorran ski mountaineer
 Manel Ruano (born 1974), Spanish football player
 Manel Terraza (born 1990), Spanish field hockey player
 Manel Wanaguru (born 1951), Sri Lankan actress
 Manel Yaakoubi (born 1992), Algerian volleyball player
 Manel de la Rosa (Barcelona, 1961), Spanish writer
 Manel del Valle
 Manél Minicucci (born 1995), Italian football player
 Zé Manel (footballer), Portuguese football player

Other
 Manel (band), Spanish (Catalan) indie pop band
 Manel Rochaid, Wheel of Time character
 manel, an all-male panel